Plectrohyla pycnochila – also known as the thicklip spikethumb frog or thick-lipped spikethumb frog – is a frog in the Hylidae family. It is endemic to Mexico and occurs in the Chiapas Highlands of central Chiapas state. Its natural habitats are pine–oak forests. It is threatened by habitat loss caused by logging and transformation of the forest to agricultural land. Chytridiomycosis might also be a threat.

References

pycnochila
Endemic amphibians of Mexico
Amphibians described in 1959
Taxa named by George B. Rabb
Central American pine–oak forests
Taxonomy articles created by Polbot
Chiapas Highlands